The cheiroballistra or manuballista (Latin), which translates in all its forms to "hand ballista", was an imperial-era Roman siege engine. Designed by Hero of Alexandria and mostly composed of metal (the spring mechanism and the skeins), it shot bolts that were smaller than those in other forms of ballistae and generally made of metal. It was the next major improvement after the scorpio.

The name of the weapon is composed of the Greek words for 'hand' and 'shooter' implying that portable versions might also have existed, similar to crossbows.

See also 
 Roman siege engines

References

External links
Article on ballista (shown), scorpio and cheiroballistra
Reconstructing the cheiroballistra (archive)
Drawing (archive)
Greco-Roman artillery

Roman siege engines
Roman artillery